Indeco Conversano is an Italian handball team.

Honours 

 Serie A
 Winners (2) : 2015, 2016

European record

External links
EHF profile

Italian handball clubs
Sport in Apulia